In Kantian philosophy, the thing-in-itself is the status of objects as they are, independent of representation and observation. The concept of the thing-in-itself was introduced by the German philosopher Immanuel Kant, and over the following centuries was met with controversy among later philosophers. It is closely related to Kant's concept of noumena or the object of inquiry, as opposed to phenomenon, its manifestations.

Kantian philosophy

In his doctrine of transcendental idealism, Kant argued the sum of all objects, the empirical world, is a complex of appearances whose existence and connection occur only in our representations. Kant introduces the thing-in-itself as follows:

Criticism

F. H. Jacobi

The first to criticize the concept of a thing-in-itself was F. H. Jacobi, with the expression:

G. E. Schulze

The anonymously published work Aenesidemus was one of the most successful attacks against the project of Kant. According to Kant’s teaching, things-in-themselves cannot cause appearances, since the category of causality can only find application on objects of experience. Kant, therefore, does not have the right to claim the existence of things-in-themselves.

This contradiction was subsequently generally accepted as being the main problem of the thing-in-itself. The attack on the thing-in-itself, and the skeptical work in general, had a big impact on Fichte, and Schopenhauer called G. E. Schulze, who was revealed to be the author, “the acutest" of Kant’s opponents.

Johann Gottlieb Fichte

Initially Fichte embraced Kantian philosophy, including a thing-in-itself, but the work of Schulze made him revise his position.

The system which Fichte subsequently published, Science of Knowledge, scraps the thing-in-itself.

Schopenhauer

In his "Critique of the Kantian Philosophy" appended to The World as Will and Representation (1818), Arthur Schopenhauer agreed with the critics that the manner in which Kant had introduced the thing-in-itself was inadmissible, but he considered that Kant was right to assert its existence and praised the distinction between thing-in-itself and appearance as Kant's greatest merit. As he wrote in volume 1 of his Parerga and Paralipomena, "Fragments of the History of Philosophy," §13:

Mainländer

A unique position is taken by Philipp Mainländer, who hailed Kant for breaking the rules of his own philosophy to proclaim the existence of a thing-in-itself.

See also
 
  (a viewpoint put forward by George Berkeley)
  of a posited object or event that exists independently of human sense and/or perception
 , according to which it is necessary to make a distinction between  a word (or phrase) and  it as a thing in itself

Notes

References

Concepts in metaphysics
Idealism
Immanuel Kant
Kantianism